Doina is a Romanian name. People with this name include:

Doina Bumbea, Romanian painter and abductee in North Korea
Doina Cornea, Romanian human rights activist
Doina Melinte, Romanian retired athlete
Doina Precup, Romanian AI researcher
Doina Rotaru, Romanian composer
Doina Ruști, Romanian novelist and writer

Doina can also refer to:
 Doina, a traditional Romanian music genre
Doina, 1883 poem by Mihai Eminescu
Doina (film), a short film by Nikolas Grasso
 Doina (moth), a genus of moths
 Doina, a village in Girov commune, Neamț County, Romania
 Doina, a village in Răuseni commune, Botoșani County, Romania
 Doina, Cahul, a commune in Cahul District, Moldova